The Politics of Schleswig-Holstein takes place within a framework of a federal parliamentary representative democratic republic, where the Federal Government of Germany exercises sovereign rights with certain powers reserved to the states of Germany including Schleswig-Holstein. The state has a multi-party system.

Executive Branch

Minister-Presidents since 1949 
Since the creation of the Federal Republic in 1945, the state's Minister-Presidents have been:

Current Cabinet

Legislative Branch 

The last elections were held on 8 May 2022.

Election results by percentage of Votes since 1949

Election results by distribution of seats since 1949

Judicial Branch 
The Schleswig-Holstein Landesverfassungsgericht was formed in 2008. Until then, Schleswig-Holstein was the last German state without a constitutional court.

References

Politics of Schleswig-Holstein
Politics of Germany